Edward Montclair Tillinghast (December 16, 1866 – June 23, 1956) was American football player and coach. While playing for the Cleveland Athletic Club, he coached the 1891 Western Reserve football team. 

Tillinghast played football at Yale University in the 1880s and was a member of Delta Kappa Epsilon.

Head coaching record

References

External links
 

1866 births
1956 deaths
19th-century players of American football
Case Western Spartans football coaches
Yale Bulldogs football players